The first election to Highland Regional Council was held on 7 May 1974 as part of the wider 1974 Scottish local elections. The election saw Independents win control of 37 of the councils 47 seats.

Aggregate results

Ward results

References

1974 Scottish local elections
1974